The Hip Hop Congress (HHC) is a non profit, international grassroots organization. Its mission is to evolve hip hop culture by inspiring social action, civic service and cultural creativity within the community. This includes events and workshops focused on the Hip Hop arts of DJing and turntablism, MCing/rapping, breakdancing, graffiti art and beatboxing. Its headquarters is located in San Jose, California.

Programs

Chapter Program — The Hip Hop Congress currently works with more than 30 chapters on university campuses, high schools, and communities around the world. Chapters engage in a range of activities promoting hip hop culture on their campus or in their community. Each chapter responds to the needs and the personalities of their local community. Many chapters produce Awareness Weeks: a week of different events focusing on hip hop culture including but not limited to festivals, concerts, academic discussions and movie screenings.
Artist Program — HHC Artists are not only defined by their ability to entertain, but more importantly through their ability to understand the important role that creative expression plays within the community.  HHC seeks to elevate the status of the “Artist” to that of “Cultural Worker” through HHC-sponsored events that represent a professional standard within the fields of arts, education, and activism. These events are designed to help hip hop artists pool resources, sell music and take advantage of opportunities the music industry has to offer without losing or giving away the rights to their works in return.
Online Program — Hip Hop Congress' online program fosters collaboration with like-minded websites and helps to connect chapters, artists, and Members.

A mirror organization, Hip Hop Congress Europe, which is based in Paris, France, networks organizations in France, Africa, England, Belgium and the Czech Republic with the intention of creating after school programs and sharing projects created in these schools through the use of technology.

History
In 1993, Real Robinson IV (Producer, Entrepreneur) started an artist organization called The Hip Hop Congress (HHC). In 1997 after meeting Shamako Noble in San Diego, Ca. They formed the first North & Southern community chapters. In 2000, Jordan Bromley and Ron Gubitz started a campus activist group called by the same name. The two groups did not know about each other until the summer of 2000, while surfing the web. Instead of arguing over who should keep the name, the two organizations merged and formed the current Hip Hop Congress.

Key Members
A national office of nine members serves as a think tank that devises new initiatives using the Congress' tools to create new inspiration and action in local communities, develops strategic partnerships with other organizations and is currently working on developing a fundraising campaign.

Rahman Jamaal, National Executive Director, Chairman of the Board
Real Robinson IV, Co-Founder (1993), Vice Chairman of the Board
Piper Carter, National Secretary
Ron Gubitz, Co-Founder (2000), Treasurer
Tina Wright, Ph.D, Boardmember
Alyssa Macy, Boardmember
Ben Eisenberg, Boardmember
Paradise Gray, Boardmember 
Asia Yu, Boardmember
Jordan Bromley, Co-Founder (2000), Legal Agent
Shamako Noble, Co-Founder (1997), Former Executive Director
Lonnie Green, Cultural Education Director
Darcel Labrie, National Recruitment Director
Alisha Francis, National Radio Director
Mike Molda, National Events Touring Director
Barbara Miron, Finances & Operations
Michael Crenshaw, Northwest Regional Director
Natalie Pohley, West Coast Regional Director
Mike Wird, Southwest Regional Director
Anita Tobin, South Regional Director
Acie Clayborne III, Midwest Regional Director
Maurice Taylor, Northeast Regional Director

References

External links
 Hip Hop Congress website
 Hip Hop Congress facebook page

Communications and media organizations based in the United States
Music organizations based in the United States
Non-profit organizations based in California
Arts organizations established in 2000
Educational organizations based in the United States